Relatives is a 2006 Hungarian drama film directed by István Szabó. It was entered into the 28th Moscow International Film Festival.

Cast
 Sándor Csányi as István Kopjáss
 Ildikó Tóth as Lina Szentkálnay
 Károly Eperjes as Soma Kardics
 Erika Marozsán as Magdaléna Szentkálnay
 Oleg Tabakov as Mayor
 Tibor Szilágyi as Mayor (voice)
 Ferenc Kállai as Uncle Berci
 Piroska Molnár as Auntie Kati
 József Madaras as Beggar Man
 Csaba Pindroch as Imri Keék
 Eliza Sodró as Julis

References

External links
 

2006 films
2006 drama films
Hungarian drama films
2000s Hungarian-language films
Films directed by István Szabó